Dwain Atkins Esper (October 7, 1894 – October 18, 1982) was an American director and producer of exploitation films.

Biography
A veteran of World War I, Esper worked as a building contractor before switching to the film business in the mid-1920s. He produced and directed inexpensive pictures with titles like Sex Maniac, Marihuana, and How to Undress in Front of Your Husband. To enhance the appeal of these low-budget features, he included scenes containing gratuitous nudity and violence that led some to label him the "father of modern exploitation."
 
Esper's wife, Hildagarde Stadie, wrote many of the scripts for his films. They employed extravagant promotional techniques that included exhibiting the mummified body of notorious Oklahoma outlaw Elmer McCurdy before it was acquired by Dan Sonney.

Maniac (1934) 
Maniac, also known as Sex Maniac, an exploitation/horror film directed by Esper, is a loose adaptation of the Edgar Allan Poe story "The Black Cat" and follows a vaudeville impersonator who becomes an assistant to a mad scientist.

It is considered by many film critics and historians to be the worst film of all time. Danny Peary believes that Maniac is the worst film made, Charlie Jane Anders of Gawker Medias io9 described it as "possibly the worst movie in history" and Chicago Tribune critic Michael Wilmington wrote that it may be the worst film he had seen, writing: "There are some voyages into ineptitude, like Dwain Esper's anti-classic Maniac, that defy all reason." Rotten Tomatoes placed Maniac on its list of movies "So Bad They're Unmissable", the Italian Vanity Fair included the film on its list of the 20 worst movies, and it is featured in The Official Razzie Movie Guide.

Esper died in San Diego, California at the age of 88. He and Hildagarde had two children, Dwain Jr. and Millicent.

Filmography

Director credits

 Sinister Harvest (1930) 
 The Seventh Commandment (1932)
 a.k.a. Sins of Love (US: reissue title)
 a.k.a. The 7th Commandment (US: poster title)
 Narcotic (1933) 
 a.k.a. Narcotic Racket (US: reissue title) 
 a.k.a. Narcotic! (US: promotional title) 
 a.k.a. Narcotic: As Interpreted by Dwain Esper (US: closing credits title)
 Maniac (1934) 
 a.k.a. Sex Maniac
 Modern Motherhood (1934) 
 Marihuana (1936) 
 a.k.a. Marihuana, the Devil's Weed 
 a.k.a. Marihuana, the Weed with Roots in Hell! 
 How to Undress in Front of Your Husband (1937)
 Sex Madness (1938) 
 a.k.a. Human Wreckage (US: reissue title) 
 a.k.a. They Must Be Told (US: reissue title) 
 Curse of the Ubangi (1946) 
 Will It Happen Again? (1948) 
 a.k.a. Love Life of Adolph Hitler (US: reissue title) 
 a.k.a. The Strange Love Life of Adolf Hitler (US: reissue title) 
 a.k.a. The Strange Loves of Adolf Hitler (US: reissue title)

Producer credits
Excluding films Esper directed.

 How to Take a Bath (1937)
 Angkor (1935)
 a.k.a. Beyond Shanghai (UK) 
 a.k.a. Forbidden Adventure (US: informal reissue title) 
 a.k.a. Forbidden Adventure in Angkor (US: reissue title, 1937)

Reissues
 Reefer Madness 
 Hell-a-Vision  
 a.k.a. Hell-o-Vision (US) 
 Man's Way with Women 
 Freaks (uncredited) as Forbidden Love, and later Natures Mistakes with Sam Alexander providing a live appearance with some disfigured members of his 'troupe'
 Cain: Aventures des mers exotiques 
 a.k.a. Cain

References

External links
 
 
 
 

Film directors from Washington (state)
Esper, Dwain
Esper, Dwain
Film producers from Washington (state)
People from Snohomish, Washington
American military personnel of World War I